Aghayev (masculine) or Aghayeva (feminine) is a surname of Azerbaijani origin. Notable people with the surname include:
Aliyar Aghayev, Azerbaijani football referee
Hasan bey Aghayev (1875–1920), Azerbaijani physician and politician
Nasimi Aghayev, Azerbaijani diplomat
Ogtay Aghayev (1935–2006), Azerbaijani Soviet singer and actor
Rafael Aghayev (born 1985), Azerbaijani karateka
Salahat Aghayev (born 1991), Azerbaijani footballer

See also 
 Agayev

Azerbaijani-language surnames